Cabreúva is a municipality (município) in the state of São Paulo in Brazil. The population is 50,429 (2020 est.) in an area of 260.23 km². The elevation is 640 m. The city takes its name from the Cabreúva tree (Myrocarpus frondosus), known as Kaburé-Iwa ("owl tree") in Tupi language.

History

The city was established in the beginning of 18th century by a member of the Martins e Ramos family, from the city of Itu, who followed the Tietê River to this place in a valley between the three mountains Japi, Guaxatuba and Taguá. Sugar cane was planted in the area for distilled beverage production, which earned the city its nickname Terra da Pinga.

Geography

The landscape is dominated by the mountains (Japi, Guaxatuba and Taguá) and the Tietê river.  The altitudes vary between 640 m in the center of the city up to 1,200 m Serra do Japi.  The area of the city is 260 km², of which 96 km² are urban and 165 km² are rural.

Population history

Demographics

According to the 2000 IBGE Census, the population was 33,100, of which 25,760 are urban and 7,340 are rural.  The life expectancy was 71.14 years. The literacy rate was 90.05%.

Events
March 24:  Day of the municipal anniversary

References

External links
  SITE VISITE CABREUVA
  Homepage of Cabreúva
  Cabreúva on citybrazil.com.br
  Cabreúva's Newspaper - Caleidoscópio
  Cabreúva's Newspaper - Mais Cabreúva
  Cabreúva's Telephone directory

Municipalities in São Paulo (state)